Scissodesma is a genus of bivalves belonging to the subfamily Mactrinae of the family Mactridae.

The species of this genus are found in Africa.

Species:

Scissodesma acutissima 
Scissodesma (Crepispisula) amekiensis 
Scissodesma angolensis 
Scissodesma micronitida 
Scissodesma nitida 
Scissodesma spengleri

References

 Vaught, K.C.; Tucker Abbott, R.; Boss, K.J. (1989). A classification of the living Mollusca. American Malacologists: Melbourne. ISBN 0-915826-22-4. XII, 195 pp.

External links
 Gray, J. E. (1837). A synoptical catalogue of the species of certain tribes or genera of shells contained in the collection of the British Museum and the author's cabinet. Magazine of Natural History, N.S. 1: 370-376.
 Gray, J. E. (1847). A list of the genera of recent Mollusca, their synonyma and types. Proceedings of the Zoological Society of London. (1847) 15: 129-219.
 Eames, F. E. 1957. Eocene Mollusca from Nigeria: a revision. Bulletin of the British Museum (Natural History) Geology 3:23–70, pls. 5–10

Mactridae
Bivalve genera